CFLN may refer to:

 CFLN-FM, a radio station licensed to Goose Bay, Newfoundland and Labrador, Canada
 French Committee of National Liberation